The Institut national de la recherche scientifique (English: 'National Institute of Scientific Research') is the research-oriented constituent university of the Université du Québec system that offers only graduate studies. INRS conducts research in four broad sectors: water, earth and the environment; energy, materials and telecommunications; human, animal and environmental health; and urbanization, culture and society.

INRS has facilities in Quebec City, Montreal, Laval, and Varennes. The enabling legislation is An Act respecting educational institutions at the university level. 

The Énergie, Matériaux et Télécommunications (EMT, Energy, Materials and Telecommunications) INRS-EMT is part of  INRS.

Programs 

The Institut national de la recherche scientifique offers programs in:
Water, Earth and Environment 
Masters in water sciences 
Doctorate in water sciences  
Masters in earth sciences 
Masters in earth sciences - environmental technologies 
Doctorate in earth sciences  
Energy, Materials and Telecommunications 
Masters in energy and materials sciences 
 Doctorate in energy and materials sciences  
Masters in telecommunications 
Joint Network IT 
Doctorate in telecommunications 
Masters in telecommunications  
INRS - Institute Armand Frappier 
Masters in experimental health sciences 
Masters in applied microbiology  
Masters in virology and immunology 
Doctorate in virology and immunology  
Doctorate in biology 
 (Urbanization, Culture and Society)
Masters in urban studies
Doctorate in urban studies
Masters in demography
Doctorate in demography
Masters in research practice and public action

References

Further reading
Ferretti, Lucia. L'Université en réseau: les 25 ans de l'Université du Québec. Sainte-Foy: Presses de l'Université du Québec, 1994.

External links 
Official INRS web site
 Environnement Urbain / Urban Environment , academic journal published by the INRS Centre Urbanisation Culture et Société

Université du Québec
Education in Montreal
Education in Quebec City
Universities in Quebec